Robert Ward Johnson (July 22, 1814 – July 26, 1879) was an American planter and lawyer who served as the senior Confederate States senator for Arkansas, a seat that he was elected to in 1861. He previously served as a delegate from Arkansas to the Provisional Congress of the Confederate States from 1861 to 1862.

Early life and education

Robert Ward Johnson was born on July 22, 1814, in Scott County, Kentucky, to Benjamin and Matilda ( Williams) Johnson. His father had three brothers who were elected as U.S. Congressmen and the family was politically prominent in the state. His grandfather had acquired thousands of acres of land in the area at the end of the eighteenth century. The family were slaveholders. His siblings included a sister Juliette. His paternal uncles were Richard Johnson, a United States Representative and Senator, and vice president of the United States under Martin Van Buren; and his brothers James Johnson and John Telemachus Johnson, older and younger, respectively, who were each elected as U.S. Representatives from Kentucky.

In 1821 when Johnson was seven, his parents moved the family to Arkansas Territory, where his father had been appointed as Superior Judge. They settled in Little Rock. His father was appointed in 1836 as the first federal district judge in the new state of Arkansas. Johnson was later sent back to Kentucky to study at the Choctaw Academy, which his uncle Richard Johnson had founded in 1825 on his farm near Georgetown, primarily to educate Choctaw boys from the Southeast in the English language and European-American culture. He was handsomely paid by the federal government.

At times, 200–300 boys attended the academy. The Choctaw students were at the school in the period prior to the Indian Removal in the 1830s of the "Five Civilized Tribes", but they were under pressure in the Southeast from encroaching settlers. His uncle kept the school going into the late 1830s, after some peoples had been forcibly relocated to Indian Territory west of the Mississippi River. The young Johnson went on to study at St. Joseph's College, an academy in Bardstown, and graduated.

After St. Joseph's, Johnson returned to Little Rock. He studied law as a legal apprentice and was admitted to the bar in 1835. He married Sarah Frances Smith in 1836. They had six children together; three survived to adulthood. Sarah died in 1862, during the American Civil War. The next year, Johnson at the age of 49 married her younger sister, Laura. They had no children.

Political career
In Little Rock, Johnson soon became involved in Democratic Party politics. He was elected as the prosecuting attorney for Little Rock and served from 1840 to 1843. He effectively acted as the state's attorney.

His sister Juliette married Ambrose Sevier, who was later elected as US Senator from Arkansas. Both Sevier and Johnson became part of The Family, a group of men related by marriage and politics, who dominated the state Democratic Party and politics, and its national representation in the antebellum years.

Prior to the American Civil War, Johnson moved his family to Helena, Arkansas, in the Mississippi Delta, where he established his law practice. Johnson was elected from there, beginning in 1846, to the Thirtieth, Thirty-first, and Thirty-second Congresses. He became chairman of the House Committee on Indian Affairs. In this period, his brother-in-law Sevier was chair of the Senate Committee on Indian Affairs.

Johnson declined to run for reelection in 1852. He was appointed by the legislature to the United States Senate to fill the unexpired term of Senator Solon Borland. In 1855, he was elected by the legislature to the seat, serving the full term until 3 March 1861. After the outbreak of the American Civil War, he served as a delegate to the Provisional Government of the Confederate States in 1862. He served as a member of the Confederate Senate from 1862 to 1865.

Later life and death
The American Civil War ended Johnson's political career. Property damage and the abolition of slavery ruined him economically. After the war, he practiced law in Washington, D.C., for more than a decade. Returning to Arkansas in the late 1870s, he ran unsuccessfully for reelection to the Senate in 1878. Johnson died in Little Rock in 1879. He is buried in the historic Mount Holly Cemetery there.

See also
 List of Freemasons
 List of Confederate States senators
 List of people from Kentucky
 List of slave owners
 List of United States representatives from Arkansas
 List of United States senators from Arkansas

References

Further reading

External links

 
 Robert Ward Johnson at The Political Graveyard
 

1814 births
1879 deaths
People from Scott County, Kentucky
Richard Mentor Johnson family
Conway-Johnson family
American people of Scottish descent
Democratic Party members of the United States House of Representatives from Arkansas
Democratic Party United States senators from Arkansas
Deputies and delegates to the Provisional Congress of the Confederate States
Confederate States of America senators
American lawyers admitted to the practice of law by reading law
American male non-fiction writers
American planters
American slave owners
Farmers from Arkansas
American political writers
American Freemasons
American proslavery activists
Lawyers from Washington, D.C.
19th-century American lawyers
19th-century American writers
19th-century male writers
People of Arkansas in the American Civil War
Infectious disease deaths in Arkansas
Burials at Mount Holly Cemetery
United States senators who owned slaves